The 1953 VFL season was the 57th season of the Victorian Football League (VFL), the highest level senior Australian rules football competition in Victoria. The season featured twelve clubs, ran from 18 April until 26 September, and comprised an 18-game home-and-away season followed by a finals series featuring the top four clubs.

The premiership was won by the Collingwood Football Club for the twelfth time, after it defeated  by twelve points in the 1953 VFL Grand Final.

Premiership season
In 1953, the VFL competition consisted of twelve teams of 18 on-the-field players each, plus two substitute players, known as the 19th man and the 20th man. A player could be substituted for any reason; however, once substituted, a player could not return to the field of play under any circumstances.

Teams played each other in a home-and-away season of 18 rounds; matches 12 to 18 were the "home-and-way reverse" of matches 1 to 7.

Once the 18 round home-and-away season had finished, the 1953 VFL Premiers were determined by the specific format and conventions of the Page–McIntyre system.

Round 1

|- bgcolor="#CCCCFF"
| Home team
| Home team score
| Away team
| Away team score
| Venue
| Crowd
| Date
|- bgcolor="#FFFFFF"
| 
| 12.15 (87)
| 
| 5.8 (38)
| Kardinia Park
| 19,877
| 18 April 1953
|- bgcolor="#FFFFFF"
| 
| 17.9 (111)
| 
| 12.16 (88)
| Windy Hill
| 23,100
| 18 April 1953
|- bgcolor="#FFFFFF"
| 
| 17.16 (118)
| 
| 11.11 (77)
| Victoria Park
| 29,678
| 18 April 1953
|- bgcolor="#FFFFFF"
| 
| 7.18 (60)
| 
| 9.11 (65)
| Princes Park
| 27,198
| 18 April 1953
|- bgcolor="#FFFFFF"
| 
| 8.9 (57)
| 
| 14.21 (105)
| Junction Oval
| 14,000
| 18 April 1953
|- bgcolor="#FFFFFF"
| 
| 11.7 (73)
| 
| 9.13 (67)
| Punt Road Oval
| 18,000
| 18 April 1953

Round 2

|- bgcolor="#CCCCFF"
| Home team
| Home team score
| Away team
| Away team score
| Venue
| Crowd
| Date
|- bgcolor="#FFFFFF"
| 
| 8.9 (57)
| 
| 13.14 (92)
| Glenferrie Oval
| 12,000
| 2 May 1953
|- bgcolor="#FFFFFF"
| 
| 8.13 (61)
| 
| 15.12 (102)
| Western Oval
| 28,500
| 2 May 1953
|- bgcolor="#FFFFFF"
| 
| 12.9 (81)
| 
| 11.14 (80)
| Brunswick Street Oval
| 21,000
| 2 May 1953
|- bgcolor="#FFFFFF"
| 
| 13.21 (99)
| 
| 13.11 (89)
| Lake Oval
| 29,231
| 2 May 1953
|- bgcolor="#FFFFFF"
| 
| 18.10 (118)
| 
| 11.9 (75)
| Arden Street Oval
| 21,377
| 2 May 1953
|- bgcolor="#FFFFFF"
| 
| 8.11 (59)
| 
| 13.12 (90)
| MCG
| 29,204
| 2 May 1953

Round 3

|- bgcolor="#CCCCFF"
| Home team
| Home team score
| Away team
| Away team score
| Venue
| Crowd
| Date
|- bgcolor="#FFFFFF"
| 
| 16.15 (111)
| 
| 6.6 (42)
| Western Oval
| 15,000
| 9 May 1953
|- bgcolor="#FFFFFF"
| 
| 17.20 (122)
| 
| 7.16 (58)
| Windy Hill
| 18,000
| 9 May 1953
|- bgcolor="#FFFFFF"
| 
| 9.19 (73)
| 
| 14.14 (98)
| Victoria Park
| 33,000
| 9 May 1953
|- bgcolor="#FFFFFF"
| 
| 12.12 (84)
| 
| 11.17 (83)
| Arden Street Oval
| 12,000
| 9 May 1953
|- bgcolor="#FFFFFF"
| 
| 10.15 (75)
| 
| 12.14 (86)
| Lake Oval
| 24,000
| 9 May 1953
|- bgcolor="#FFFFFF"
| 
| 15.8 (98)
| 
| 16.8 (104)
| Punt Road Oval
| 31,000
| 9 May 1953

Round 4

|- bgcolor="#CCCCFF"
| Home team
| Home team score
| Away team
| Away team score
| Venue
| Crowd
| Date
|- bgcolor="#FFFFFF"
| 
| 7.11 (53)
| 
| 9.9 (63)
| Glenferrie Oval
| 12,000
| 16 May 1953
|- bgcolor="#FFFFFF"
| 
| 12.14 (86)
| 
| 10.15 (75)
| Brunswick Street Oval
| 20,500
| 16 May 1953
|- bgcolor="#FFFFFF"
| 
| 14.11 (95)
| 
| 14.19 (103)
| Princes Park
| 37,500
| 16 May 1953
|- bgcolor="#FFFFFF"
| 
| 11.17 (83)
| 
| 8.17 (65)
| Junction Oval
| 16,500
| 16 May 1953
|- bgcolor="#FFFFFF"
| 
| 4.6 (30)
| 
| 9.21 (75)
| MCG
| 23,727
| 16 May 1953
|- bgcolor="#FFFFFF"
| 
| 12.7 (79)
| 
| 9.11 (65)
| Kardinia Park
| 35,000
| 16 May 1953

Round 5

|- bgcolor="#CCCCFF"
| Home team
| Home team score
| Away team
| Away team score
| Venue
| Crowd
| Date
|- bgcolor="#FFFFFF"
| 
| 6.10 (46)
| 
| 9.3 (57)
| Windy Hill
| 9,500
| 23 May 1953
|- bgcolor="#FFFFFF"
| 
| 13.18 (96)
| 
| 3.8 (26)
| Victoria Park
| 9,627
| 23 May 1953
|- bgcolor="#FFFFFF"
| 
| 7.10 (52)
| 
| 6.7 (43)
| Princes Park
| 9,150
| 23 May 1953
|- bgcolor="#FFFFFF"
| 
| 8.10 (58)
| 
| 9.8 (62)
| Lake Oval
| 11,000
| 23 May 1953
|- bgcolor="#FFFFFF"
| 
| 6.16 (52)
| 
| 15.16 (106)
| Punt Road Oval
| 10,000
| 23 May 1953
|- bgcolor="#FFFFFF"
| 
| 10.6 (66)
| 
| 1.0 (6)
| Western Oval
| 14,087
| 23 May 1953

Round 6

|- bgcolor="#CCCCFF"
| Home team
| Home team score
| Away team
| Away team score
| Venue
| Crowd
| Date
|- bgcolor="#FFFFFF"
| 
| 14.16 (100)
| 
| 7.5 (47)
| Kardinia Park
| 24,832
| 30 May 1953
|- bgcolor="#FFFFFF"
| 
| 9.8 (62)
| 
| 5.9 (39)
| Victoria Park
| 23,036
| 30 May 1953
|- bgcolor="#FFFFFF"
| 
| 10.9 (69)
| 
| 14.9 (93)
| Junction Oval
| 19,000
| 30 May 1953
|- bgcolor="#FFFFFF"
| 
| 10.11 (71)
| 
| 12.9 (81)
| MCG
| 21,205
| 30 May 1953
|- bgcolor="#FFFFFF"
| 
| 7.9 (51)
| 
| 9.14 (68)
| Arden Street Oval
| 25,000
| 30 May 1953
|- bgcolor="#FFFFFF"
| 
| 10.7 (67)
| 
| 6.11 (47)
| Glenferrie Oval
| 12,000
| 30 May 1953

Round 7

|- bgcolor="#CCCCFF"
| Home team
| Home team score
| Away team
| Away team score
| Venue
| Crowd
| Date
|- bgcolor="#FFFFFF"
| 
| 7.11 (53)
| 
| 18.16 (124)
| Junction Oval
| 21,000
| 6 June 1953
|- bgcolor="#FFFFFF"
| 
| 8.12 (60)
| 
| 5.14 (44)
| Brunswick Street Oval
| 9,500
| 6 June 1953
|- bgcolor="#FFFFFF"
| 
| 11.18 (84)
| 
| 7.6 (48)
| Windy Hill
| 21,000
| 6 June 1953
|- bgcolor="#FFFFFF"
| 
| 14.16 (100)
| 
| 7.6 (48)
| Princes Park
| 22,219
| 6 June 1953
|- bgcolor="#FFFFFF"
| 
| 8.10 (58)
| 
| 11.16 (82)
| MCG
| 26,254
| 6 June 1953
|- bgcolor="#FFFFFF"
| 
| 7.9 (51)
| 
| 7.10 (52)
| Western Oval
| 32,114
| 6 June 1953

Round 8

|- bgcolor="#CCCCFF"
| Home team
| Home team score
| Away team
| Away team score
| Venue
| Crowd
| Date
|- bgcolor="#FFFFFF"
| 
| 8.14 (62)
| 
| 12.8 (80)
| Glenferrie Oval
| 7,000
| 13 June 1953
|- bgcolor="#FFFFFF"
| 
| 19.17 (131)
| 
| 8.8 (56)
| Victoria Park
| 16,200
| 13 June 1953
|- bgcolor="#FFFFFF"
| 
| 11.11 (77)
| 
| 9.17 (71)
| Lake Oval
| 22,565
| 13 June 1953
|- bgcolor="#FFFFFF"
| 
| 8.11 (59)
| 
| 9.14 (68)
| Punt Road Oval
| 16,000
| 13 June 1953
|- bgcolor="#FFFFFF"
| 
| 21.10 (136)
| 
| 7.8 (50)
| Kardinia Park
| 21,489
| 13 June 1953
|- bgcolor="#FFFFFF"
| 
| 14.14 (98)
| 
| 7.11 (53)
| Windy Hill
| 30,300
| 13 June 1953

Round 9

|- bgcolor="#CCCCFF"
| Home team
| Home team score
| Away team
| Away team score
| Venue
| Crowd
| Date
|- bgcolor="#FFFFFF"
| 
| 6.9 (45)
| 
| 5.12 (42)
| Arden Street Oval
| 9,000
| 20 June 1953
|- bgcolor="#FFFFFF"
| 
| 5.13 (43)
| 
| 11.6 (72)
| Western Oval
| 21,105
| 20 June 1953
|- bgcolor="#FFFFFF"
| 
| 6.8 (44)
| 
| 9.6 (60)
| Junction Oval
| 9,500
| 20 June 1953
|- bgcolor="#FFFFFF"
| 
| 9.10 (64)
| 
| 12.15 (87)
| Glenferrie Oval
| 8,000
| 20 June 1953
|- bgcolor="#FFFFFF"
| 
| 7.6 (48)
| 
| 9.9 (63)
| MCG
| 27,175
| 20 June 1953
|- bgcolor="#FFFFFF"
| 
| 7.12 (54)
| 
| 7.18 (60)
| Brunswick Street Oval
| 15,000
| 20 June 1953

Round 10

|- bgcolor="#CCCCFF"
| Home team
| Home team score
| Away team
| Away team score
| Venue
| Crowd
| Date
|- bgcolor="#FFFFFF"
| 
| 11.9 (75)
| 
| 7.10 (52)
| Brunswick Street Oval
| 9,500
| 27 June 1953
|- bgcolor="#FFFFFF"
| 
| 8.15 (63)
| 
| 10.14 (74)
| Princes Park
| 32,526
| 27 June 1953
|- bgcolor="#FFFFFF"
| 
| 12.7 (79)
| 
| 6.14 (50)
| Lake Oval
| 17,000
| 27 June 1953
|- bgcolor="#FFFFFF"
| 
| 10.14 (74)
| 
| 16.6 (102)
| MCG
| 11,993
| 27 June 1953
|- bgcolor="#FFFFFF"
| 
| 3.7 (25)
| 
| 5.12 (42)
| Arden Street Oval
| 15,000
| 27 June 1953
|- bgcolor="#FFFFFF"
| 
| 11.14 (80)
| 
| 6.16 (52)
| Windy Hill
| 31,900
| 27 June 1953

Round 11

|- bgcolor="#CCCCFF"
| Home team
| Home team score
| Away team
| Away team score
| Venue
| Crowd
| Date
|- bgcolor="#FFFFFF"
| 
| 12.14 (86)
| 
| 13.7 (85)
| Kardinia Park
| 21,130
| 4 July 1953
|- bgcolor="#FFFFFF"
| 
| 7.19 (61)
| 
| 9.8 (62)
| Victoria Park
| 25,078
| 4 July 1953
|- bgcolor="#FFFFFF"
| 
| 14.13 (97)
| 
| 10.13 (73)
| Princes Park
| 29,688
| 4 July 1953
|- bgcolor="#FFFFFF"
| 
| 11.7 (73)
| 
| 8.21 (69)
| Junction Oval
| 12,000
| 4 July 1953
|- bgcolor="#FFFFFF"
| 
| 12.10 (82)
| 
| 7.6 (48)
| Punt Road Oval
| 11,000
| 4 July 1953
|- bgcolor="#FFFFFF"
| 
| 9.15 (69)
| 
| 7.11 (53)
| Western Oval
| 34,884
| 4 July 1953

Round 12

|- bgcolor="#CCCCFF"
| Home team
| Home team score
| Away team
| Away team score
| Venue
| Crowd
| Date
|- bgcolor="#FFFFFF"
| 
| 11.9 (75)
| 
| 11.9 (75)
| MCG
| 19,402
| 11 July 1953
|- bgcolor="#FFFFFF"
| 
| 9.8 (62)
| 
| 12.14 (86)
| Glenferrie Oval
| 14,000
| 11 July 1953
|- bgcolor="#FFFFFF"
| 
| 13.12 (90)
| 
| 8.18 (66)
| Western Oval
| 31,668
| 11 July 1953
|- bgcolor="#FFFFFF"
| 
| 20.11 (131)
| 
| 5.16 (46)
| Arden Street Oval
| 10,500
| 18 July 1953
|- bgcolor="#FFFFFF"
| 
| 7.20 (62)
| 
| 14.13 (97)
| Brunswick Street Oval
| 25,500
| 18 July 1953
|- bgcolor="#FFFFFF"
| 
| 12.9 (81)
| 
| 17.17 (119)
| Lake Oval
| 30,000
| 18 July 1953

Round 13

|- bgcolor="#CCCCFF"
| Home team
| Home team score
| Away team
| Away team score
| Venue
| Crowd
| Date
|- bgcolor="#FFFFFF"
| 
| 12.11 (83)
| 
| 8.14 (62)
| Windy Hill
| 23,000
| 25 July 1953
|- bgcolor="#FFFFFF"
| 
| 13.16 (94)
| 
| 8.17 (65)
| Victoria Park
| 23,868
| 25 July 1953
|- bgcolor="#FFFFFF"
| 
| 12.24 (96)
| 
| 10.10 (70)
| Princes Park
| 16,367
| 25 July 1953
|- bgcolor="#FFFFFF"
| 
| 9.13 (67)
| 
| 4.14 (38)
| Junction Oval
| 7,500
| 25 July 1953
|- bgcolor="#FFFFFF"
| 
| 11.12 (78)
| 
| 8.10 (58)
| Kardinia Park
| 32,093
| 25 July 1953
|- bgcolor="#FFFFFF"
| 
| 13.7 (85)
| 
| 13.12 (90)
| Punt Road Oval
| 15,000
| 25 July 1953

Round 14

|- bgcolor="#CCCCFF"
| Home team
| Home team score
| Away team
| Away team score
| Venue
| Crowd
| Date
|- bgcolor="#FFFFFF"
| 
| 9.13 (67)
| 
| 8.16 (64)
| MCG
| 13,768
| 1 August 1953
|- bgcolor="#FFFFFF"
| 
| 12.18 (90)
| 
| 7.19 (61)
| Brunswick Street Oval
| 16,000
| 1 August 1953
|- bgcolor="#FFFFFF"
| 
| 15.16 (106)
| 
| 10.19 (79)
| Princes Park
| 21,508
| 1 August 1953
|- bgcolor="#FFFFFF"
| 
| 3.10 (28)
| 
| 11.10 (76)
| Glenferrie Oval
| 10,000
| 1 August 1953
|- bgcolor="#FFFFFF"
| 
| 9.10 (64)
| 
| 14.15 (99)
| Junction Oval
| 19,500
| 1 August 1953
|- bgcolor="#FFFFFF"
| 
| 7.13 (55)
| 
| 10.15 (75)
| Kardinia Park
| 31,635
| 1 August 1953

Round 15

|- bgcolor="#CCCCFF"
| Home team
| Home team score
| Away team
| Away team score
| Venue
| Crowd
| Date
|- bgcolor="#FFFFFF"
| 
| 13.16 (94)
| 
| 11.14 (80)
| Punt Road Oval
| 9,500
| 8 August 1953
|- bgcolor="#FFFFFF"
| 
| 14.14 (98)
| 
| 9.7 (61)
| Western Oval
| 18,075
| 8 August 1953
|- bgcolor="#FFFFFF"
| 
| 8.13 (61)
| 
| 7.8 (50)
| Windy Hill
| 41,000
| 8 August 1953
|- bgcolor="#FFFFFF"
| 
| 7.12 (54)
| 
| 9.8 (62)
| Lake Oval
| 8,500
| 8 August 1953
|- bgcolor="#FFFFFF"
| 
| 17.19 (121)
| 
| 7.9 (51)
| Arden Street Oval
| 12,000
| 8 August 1953
|- bgcolor="#FFFFFF"
| 
| 12.15 (87)
| 
| 9.16 (70)
| Victoria Park
| 31,277
| 8 August 1953

Round 16

|- bgcolor="#CCCCFF"
| Home team
| Home team score
| Away team
| Away team score
| Venue
| Crowd
| Date
|- bgcolor="#FFFFFF"
| 
| 8.8 (56)
| 
| 11.21 (87)
| Arden Street Oval
| 8,000
| 15 August 1953
|- bgcolor="#FFFFFF"
| 
| 14.18 (102)
| 
| 4.9 (33)
| Kardinia Park
| 10,000
| 15 August 1953
|- bgcolor="#FFFFFF"
| 
| 7.11 (53)
| 
| 14.14 (98)
| Brunswick Street Oval
| 17,500
| 15 August 1953
|- bgcolor="#FFFFFF"
| 
| 8.9 (57)
| 
| 12.10 (82)
| MCG
| 25,543
| 15 August 1953
|- bgcolor="#FFFFFF"
| 
| 11.6 (72)
| 
| 12.16 (88)
| Glenferrie Oval
| 7,000
| 15 August 1953
|- bgcolor="#FFFFFF"
| 
| 8.15 (63)
| 
| 7.16 (58)
| Junction Oval
| 9,700
| 15 August 1953

Round 17

|- bgcolor="#CCCCFF"
| Home team
| Home team score
| Away team
| Away team score
| Venue
| Crowd
| Date
|- bgcolor="#FFFFFF"
| 
| 12.18 (90)
| 
| 4.5 (29)
| Western Oval
| 15,158
| 22 August 1953
|- bgcolor="#FFFFFF"
| 
| 6.13 (49)
| 
| 9.10 (64)
| Brunswick Street Oval
| 7,500
| 22 August 1953
|- bgcolor="#FFFFFF"
| 
| 12.6 (78)
| 
| 12.7 (79)
| Windy Hill
| 18,000
| 22 August 1953
|- bgcolor="#FFFFFF"
| 
| 12.15 (87)
| 
| 6.9 (45)
| Princes Park
| 8,500
| 22 August 1953
|- bgcolor="#FFFFFF"
| 
| 14.14 (98)
| 
| 8.7 (55)
| Lake Oval
| 21,000
| 22 August 1953
|- bgcolor="#FFFFFF"
| 
| 12.9 (81)
| 
| 13.17 (95)
| Punt Road Oval
| 18,000
| 22 August 1953

Round 18

|- bgcolor="#CCCCFF"
| Home team
| Home team score
| Away team
| Away team score
| Venue
| Crowd
| Date
|- bgcolor="#FFFFFF"
| 
| 16.14 (110)
| 
| 8.8 (56)
| Kardinia Park
| 18,124
| 29 August 1953
|- bgcolor="#FFFFFF"
| 
| 10.14 (74)
| 
| 8.7 (55)
| Victoria Park
| 33,867
| 29 August 1953
|- bgcolor="#FFFFFF"
| 
| 13.20 (98)
| 
| 4.12 (36)
| Lake Oval
| 13,000
| 29 August 1953
|- bgcolor="#FFFFFF"
| 
| 9.10 (64)
| 
| 13.6 (84)
| Glenferrie Oval
| 5,000
| 29 August 1953
|- bgcolor="#FFFFFF"
| 
| 13.7 (85)
| 
| 19.12 (126)
| Punt Road Oval
| 19,000
| 29 August 1953
|- bgcolor="#FFFFFF"
| 
| 14.10 (94)
| 
| 15.15 (105)
| Arden Street Oval
| 14,000
| 29 August 1953

Ladder

Finals

First Semi-Final

Second Semi-Final

Preliminary Final

Grand final

Awards
 The 1953 VFL Premiership team was Collingwood.
 The VFL's leading goalkicker was John Coleman of Essendon who kicked 97 goals (including one goal in the finals).
 The winner of the 1953 Brownlow Medal was Bill Hutchison of Essendon with 26 votes.
 Hawthorn took the "wooden spoon" in 1953.

Notable events
 Because Anzac Day fell on a Saturday, there was a fortnight between Rounds 1 and 2. On the evening of Friday 24 April a night-time exhibition match was held between Collingwood and Fitzroy, under lights, at the Royal Melbourne Showgrounds for the benefit of St Vincent's Hospital. Collingwood 9.13 (67) defeated Fitzroy 4.19 (43) before a crowd of 22,000.
 Footscray won its first final since joining the league in 1925, their twenty-ninth season. This came after making the finals six times previously and being eliminated each time (1938, 1942, 1944, 1946, 1948 and 1951).
 In Round 2, John Coleman kicked 11 of Essendon's 13 goals.
 In Round 5, Fitzroy came close to becoming the first (and only) VFL/AFL team to be held scoreless in their match against Footscray at the Western Oval, which was played amidst heavy rain and a burst water main. Allan Ruthven managed their only scoring shot, a goal, with about six minutes remaining in the match. To date, it remains the longest amount of time a team has been kept scoreless in a match.
 In a streak spanning from 1952 until 1953,  won 23 consecutive matches and played 26 consecutive matches without defeat; both of these remain VFL/AFL records as of 2021. The winning streak ended in Round 14, when Collingwood defeated Geelong by 20 points. At the time, Geelong had a 13–0 record and a four game lead over second-place, but won only three of its eight remaining games for the season.
 Overall it was a low-scoring season: Footscray's 959 points against remains the lowest average points conceded per game since 1919; the season's highest score of 21.10 (136) was the lowest since 1924; and, for the first time since 1927, there was no match where both teams scored more than 100 points.
 The Collingwood Grand Final team contained three sets of brothers: Lou Richards and Ron Richards; Bob Rose and Bill Rose; Bill Twomey Jr., Pat Twomey, and Mick Twomey.
Collingwood supporter and businessman John Wren suffered a heart attack at the 1953 Grand Final and died one month later.

References

 Maplestone, M., Flying Higher: History of the Essendon Football Club 1872–1996, Essendon Football Club, (Melbourne), 1996. 
 Rogers, S. & Brown, A., Every Game Ever Played: VFL/AFL Results 1897–1997 (Sixth Edition), Viking Books, (Ringwood), 1998. 
 Ross, J. (ed), 100 Years of Australian Football 1897–1996: The Complete Story of the AFL, All the Big Stories, All the Great Pictures, All the Champions, Every AFL Season Reported, Viking, (Ringwood), 1996.

External links
 1953 Season - AFL Tables
 Ken Piesse, "Stray Cat lifts lid on Grand Final dumping", (Sunday Herald Sun, 23 September 2007)

Australian Football League seasons
Vfl season